Carlos Moreno Gómez (born 14 February 1992) is a Spanish footballer who plays for Las Rozas CF mainly as a right back.

Club career
Born in Villarrobledo, Albacete, Castilla-La Mancha, Moreno was a youth product at Albacete Balompié, making his senior debuts with the reserves in the 2010–11 campaign, in Tercera División. In October 2012 he was promoted to the main squad in Segunda División B.

On 10 September 2014, Moreno played his first match as a professional, starting in a 1–0 home win over Real Zaragoza for the season's Copa del Rey. His Segunda División debut came on 11 October by playing the full 90 minutes in a 0–1 home loss against Girona FC.

On 11 July 2015 Moreno signed a two-year deal with fellow league team CD Mirandés.

References

External links

1992 births
Living people
Sportspeople from the Province of Albacete
Spanish footballers
Footballers from Castilla–La Mancha
Association football defenders
Segunda División B players
Tercera División players
Atlético Albacete players
Albacete Balompié players
CD Mirandés footballers
UCAM Murcia CF players
Mérida AD players
Las Rozas CF players